Craig B. Zimmerman (born May 21, 1974 in Hampton, Virginia, USA) is an American actor of film and television. His films include In the Light of the Moon, See Arnold Run, Backwoods and Tandem. He has also guest starred on such series as Buffy the Vampire Slayer (in the episode The Gift) and Modern Family (in the episodes "Boys' Night", "Treehouse" and "Fulgencio").

References

1974 births
American male television actors
Living people
21st-century American male actors
People from Hampton, Virginia